Pultenaea rotundifolia is a species of flowering plant in the family Fabaceae and is endemic to the south of Western Australia. It is a straggling, spreading shrub with flat, glabrous leaves, and yellow flowers with red markings.

Description
Flowering occurs from September to December and the fruit is a flattened pod.

Taxonomy and naming
This species was first formally described in 1853 by Nikolai Turczaninow who gave it the name Euchilus rotundifolius in the Bulletin de la Société impériale des naturalistes de Moscou from specimens collected by James Drummond. In 1864, George Bentham changed the name to Pultenaea rotundifolia in Flora Australiensis. The specific epithet (rotundifolia) means "round-leaved".

Distribution
This pultenaea grows on undulating plains in the Avon Wheatbelt, Esperance Plains and Mallee biogeographic regions in the south of Western Australia.

Conservation status
Pultenaea rotundifolia is classified as "not threatened" by the Government of Western Australia Department of Biodiversity, Conservation and Attractions.

References

rotundifolia
Eudicots of Western Australia
Plants described in 1853
Taxa named by Nikolai Turczaninow